Renick is a village in Randolph County, Missouri, United States. The population was 172 at the 2010 census.

History
Renick was first named "Randolph", and under the latter name was founded in 1856. A post office called Randolph was established in 1858, and the name was changed to Renick in 1884. The present name is after one Mr. Renick, a railroad man.

Geography
Renick is located at  (39.342316, -92.412515).

Demographics

2010 census
As of the census of 2010, there were 172 people, 70 households, and 51 families living in the village. The racial makeup of the village was 99.4% White and 0.6% African American. Hispanic or Latino of any race were 1.7% of the population.

There were 70 households, of which 31.4% had children under the age of 18 living with them, 61.4% were married couples living together, 8.6% had a female householder with no husband present, 2.9% had a male householder with no wife present, and 27.1% were non-families. 21.4% of all households were made up of individuals, and 5.8% had someone living alone who was 65 years of age or older. The average household size was 2.46 and the average family size was 2.86.

The median age in the village was 42.7 years. 23.3% of residents were under the age of 18; 9.3% were between the ages of 18 and 24; 19.2% were from 25 to 44; 31.4% were from 45 to 64; and 16.9% were 65 years of age or older. The gender makeup of the village was 52.3% male and 47.7% female.

2000 census
As of the census of 2000, there were 221 people, 82 households, and 59 families living in the village. The population density was 1,105.4 people per square mile (426.6/km). There were 93 housing units at an average density of 465.2 per square mile (179.5/km). The racial makeup of the village was 95.48% White, 0.90% Native American, and 3.62% from two or more races.

There were 82 households, out of which 37.8% had children under the age of 18 living with them, 53.7% were married couples living together, 12.2% had a female householder with no husband present, and 28.0% were non-families. 23.2% of all households were made up of individuals, and 7.3% had someone living alone who was 65 years of age or older. The average household size was 2.70 and the average family size was 3.22.

In the village, the population was spread out, with 30.8% under the age of 18, 5.9% from 18 to 24, 26.7% from 25 to 44, 26.7% from 45 to 64, and 10.0% who were 65 years of age or older. The median age was 36 years. For every 100 females, there were 93.9 males. For every 100 females age 18 and over, there were 98.7 males.

The median income for a household in the village was $30,313, and the median income for a family was $37,500. Males had a median income of $25,625 versus $20,714 for females. The per capita income for the village was $12,549. About 10.0% of families and 10.8% of the population were below the poverty line, including 11.8% of those under the age of eighteen and 14.3% of those 65 or over.

References

Villages in Randolph County, Missouri
Villages in Missouri